Nemanja Milosavljević (born 30 July 1992) is a Serbian football defender who last played for Trayal Kruševac.

References

External links
 
 

1992 births
Living people
Sportspeople from Kruševac
Association football defenders
Serbian footballers
FK Napredak Kruševac players
FK Radnik Surdulica players
FK Dinamo Vranje players
FK Loznica players
FK Trayal Kruševac players
Serbian First League players